Transilvania TV is a regional channel located in Transylvania, owned by Centrul National Media.

Television stations in Romania